"It's in Our Hands" is a song by Icelandic recording artist and songwriter Björk, released as the first and only single from her first greatest hits album Greatest Hits (2002). Like her previous work, the song was written by her and co-produced by her along with Matmos. Musically, "It's in Our Hands" is an electronic song that is influenced by glitch music, abstract sounds, ambient and synthpop. The song received favorable reviews from many music critics and reached number 37 in the United Kingdom.

Composition
"It's in Our Hands" is mostly distinctive for its usage of "bubbling keyboards and clicks." The song relies heavily on a sample taken from Gigi Masin's song "Clouds" from the album Les Nouvelles Musiques De Chambre (1989).

PopMatterss Kila Packett said that in the song "Björk's distinctly broken voice dances nakedly across the canvas like a newborn child—virginal and sensually full of life. Beautifully chimed ticks, scratches, clangs and lush melodic vibrations support her breathy voice. With layers and layers of nicely timed loops, rings, and jingles she has concocted a stereophonic world of audible feasting."

Critical reception
"It's in Our Hands" received favorable reviews from music critics. Heather Phares from AllMusic called the song "lovely" saying "the lovely "It's in Our Hands," help compensate for the omissions about which fans could potentially complain." to which she referenced the lack of other tracks on her greatest hits album. While commenting on the omitting of most of Bjork's successful songs on the compilation, Chris Ott from Pitchfork said "A few stellar long-players like "Headphones" and "The Anchor Song" also fall by the wayside, but it may be worth whatever sacrifice for the bubbling keyboards and clicks behind her latest single "It's in Our Hands" [...]" Sal Cinquemani from Slant Magazine said that this song along with "Play Dead" were the only good songs on the album due to the absence of many other good tracks from the compilation. Scott Plagenhoef from Stylus Magazine said "On the hits collection, the crumbs for the completist include two singles mixes—the sublime “All Is Full of Love” and four-to-the-floor “Violently Happy”—a wide released for her John Barryesque David Arnold collaboration, “Play Dead,” and a new song, the gorgeous “It’s in Our Hands.” The well-chosen hits package is the best Björk primer and the place to go for casual fans. Whether it offers enough reason for her die-hard fans to purchase it is less certain."

Music video
The music video, directed by Spike Jonze, features a 3rd trimester, pregnant Björk shot at night with a night-vision camera amongst bushes. Her image is transposed against close-ups of flowers, plants, and bugs to make her appear as if she is smaller than them. There are also shots of underwater scenes interspersed throughout the video.

A second video was directed by Lynn Fox and set to the Soft Pink Truth remix of "It's in Our Hands."

Track listings

UK CD1
"It's in Our Hands"
"Cocoon" (Retangled By Ensemble)
"All is Full of Love" (Live in Brussels)

UK CD2
"It's in Our Hands" (Soft Pink Truth Mix)
"It's in Our Hands" (Arcade Mix)
"So Broken" (Live on Jools Holland)

UK/EU DVD
"It's in Our Hands" (Video)
"Harm of Will" (Live in Barcelona) (Audio)
"Undo" (Live in Barcelona) (Audio)

EU CD
"It's in Our Hands"
"It's in Our Hands" (Soft Pink Truth Mix)
"It's in Our Hands" (Arcade Mix)

JP CD
"It's in Our Hands"
"It's in Our Hands" (Soft Pink Truth Mix)
"It's in Our Hands" (Arcade Mix)
"So Broken" (Live on Jools Holland)
"Cocoon" (Retangled by Ensemble)

12"
"It's in Our Hands" (Soft Pink Truth Mix)
"It's in Our Hands" (Arcade Mix)

Live
"It's in Our Hands", being the only single released from Greatest Hits, was normally played at the end of same era concerts, but existed in two different versions. One was seemingly identical to the album version, but featured an Inuit version of the children's song "Paddycake", whereas the other version was actually a dance remix by the Soft Pink Truth. This version is especially popular amongst fans and has been described as "spending a long winter at home (Vespertine) and then having a discoball drop out of your ceiling".

Personnel
Credits adapted from the liner notes of "It's in Our Hands".
 Björk – vocals, production, composition
 Drew Daniel – production
 Mark "Spike" Stent – mixing
 Howie Weinberg – mastering
 Jennifer Quinn – production manager
 Roger Lian – digital editing

Charts

References

External links
It's In Our Hands webpage

2002 singles
Björk songs
Music videos directed by Spike Jonze
Songs written by Björk
Song recordings produced by Björk
2002 songs
One Little Indian Records singles